In the United States penal system, upwards of 20 percent of state and federal prison inmates and 18 percent of local jail inmates are kept in solitary confinement or another form of restrictive housing at some point during their imprisonment. Solitary confinement generally comes in one of two forms: disciplinary segregation, in which inmates are temporarily placed in solitary confinement as punishment for rulebreaking; and administrative segregation, in which prisoners deemed to be a risk to the safety of other inmates, prison staff, or to themselves are placed in solitary confinement for extended periods of time, often months or years.

Solitary confinement first arose in the United States in the 1700s among religious groups like the Quakers, who thought isolation with a Bible would lead to repentance and rehabilitation. The practice expanded significantly in the nineteenth century, when it was viewed as a humane alternative to prevailing methods of punishment like public floggings. However, by the early 1900s it had largely passed into disuse due to its high cost and the view that it was unethical. It would return as a common form of incarceration during the tough on crime political period in the 1980s and 1990s.

Today, solitary confinement is a controversial form of punishment that studies suggest has long-lasting detrimental effects on inmates' psychological health. Prison officials argue that solitary confinement is a necessary method of separating violent prisoners from the general population, separating vulnerable inmates (such as juveniles) from other inmates, and punishing prisoners who attempt to cause riots or try to escape. Critics argue that it is a cruel form of punishment which has been demonstrated to have long-lasting negative psychological effects on inmates (with some critics further contending that long-term solitary confinement is a form of torture) and is an unnecessary method of sequestering violent or vulnerable inmates, who can be safely separated through more humane means. Court cases arguing that solitary confinement violates the Eighth Amendment to the United States Constitution's ban on cruel and unusual punishment have had mixed success, with solitary confinement found to constitute cruel and unusual punishment when applied to mentally ill inmates but deemed permissible for sane adults.

History 
The penal system in the United States developed under two separate systems known as the Auburn system and Pennsylvania system. The current system of solitary confinement was derived originally from the Pennsylvania model which was characterized by "isolation and seclusion." Evidence has shown that Quakers and Calvinists supported solitary confinement as an alternative form of punishment. At the time it was meant to provide a prisoner with solitude “to reflect on his misdeeds” and restore his relationship with God. Solitary confinement was intended as an alternative to public floggings which were common at the time. In 1818, New York reformer and Friend, Thomas Eddy, lobbied for inmate labor and solitary confinement in place of other forms of punishment such as hanging. Shortly after, New York decided to include solitary confinement and inmate labor into their penal system.

In the US Federal Prison system, solitary confinement is known as the Special Housing Unit (SHU), pronounced like "shoe". California's prison system also uses the abbreviation SHU, but it stands for Security Housing Units. In other states, it is known as the Special Management Unit (SMU).  Current estimates of the number of inmates held in solitary confinement are difficult to determine, though generally the minimum held at any given time has been determined to be 20,000, with estimates as high as 80,000.

The inmate held in solitary confinement for the longest time in U.S. federal prison was Thomas Silverstein, held in solitary confinement at the ADX Florence federal penitentiary in Colorado.  beginning in 1983.  Silverstein died in late May 2019.  The inmate held in solitary confinement for the longest time in the United States is Albert Woodfox, the last of the Angola Three, in solitary in Louisiana State Penitentiary from 1972 to 2016. A May 2013 report on California's Pelican Bay State Prison in Mother Jones magazine also cites one inmate there who "recently marked his 40th year in solitary".

Legality
Opponents of solitary confinement have argued with varying success that the practice violates prisoners' constitutional rights. Despite the long history of litigation over the practice, the US Supreme Court has yet to definitively state whether or not solitary confinement is unconstitutional. The Supreme Court considered the constitutionality of long-term solitary confinement only once, in Wilkinson v. Austin. In contrast to the Supreme Court's inaction, lower courts have imposed constitutional limitations on the use of solitary confinement. Despite such limitations, the federal courts have refused to find that solitary confinement is per se unconstitutional. The U.S. has also effectively "insulated itself from any official sanction for international violations by not submitting to the jurisdiction" of committees that enforce the International Covenant on Civil and Political Rights (ICCPR) or of the Committee Against Torture (CAT).

Beginning August 1, 2020, the state of New Jersey will limit solitary confinement to 20 consecutive days and a total of 30 days during a 60-day period. The Isolated Confinement Restriction Act (A314/S3261) was signed by governor Phil Murphy on July 11, 2019.

Eighth Amendment
Since solitary confinement has been designated as "cruel, inhuman or degrading treatment or punishment" under international law, many lawyers have argued that it is also the kind of "cruel and unusual punishments" prohibited by the Eighth Amendment. Proving this to be the case, however, has been a difficult task for attorneys at every level of the court system.  The lack of clarity of the Eighth Amendment has raised questions with the use of solitary confinement that specifically constitutes "cruel and unusual punishment."

In light of the serious, long-lasting psychological effects solitary confinement can have, inmates have argued that the mental injuries they suffer qualify as "cruel and unusual punishment." Prison officials contend that placing inmates in prolonged solitary confinement is necessary for various reasons.  Some of these reasons include separating violent prisoners from the general population, separating vulnerable inmates (such as juveniles) from others, and punishing those prisoners who attempt to cause riots or try to escape. Prisoners argue, however, that the nature of these kinds of offenses does not justify the use of solitary confinement; in their eyes "there is simply no strong security need for the total social isolation that exists at some supermax prisons".

A large portion of the court cases addressing solitary confinement have approached the practice as a violation of Eighth Amendment rights. Courts have generally agreed that solitary confinement is, indeed, a violation of the Eighth Amendment for inmates with preexisting mental illness or juveniles. However, the Supreme Court concluded that "while there was a risk of serious psychological injury to inmates, that risk was not of 'sufficiently serious magnitude' to find a 'per se' violation of the Eighth Amendment for all prisoners placed in long-term solitary confinement". Despite recognition of the negative consequences of forced isolation in prisons, the practice of solitary confinement remains constitutional in the United States.

Showing that solitary confinement constitutes cruel and unusual punishment has proven difficult for inmates and their attorneys. The Supreme Court requires 'extreme deprivations' in order to have merits for a 'conditions-of-confinement claim' and courts have also held that inmates are only protected against "certain kinds of extreme deprivations" by the Eighth Amendment. In Farmer v. Brennan, the Supreme Court set two requirements that must be fulfilled in order to challenge solitary confinement as "cruel and unusual". First, prisoners must show that a "substantial risk of serious harm to inmates" exists and second, that the prison officials were "deliberately indifferent" to such risk. To prove a prison official's "deliberate indifference," the prisoner must "show evidence that the official was 'actually' aware of a prisoner's serious need and chose to ignore it". Since the psychological impact of solitary confinement is not believed to be "objectively" cruel and unusual within the U.S. legal system, and because it is difficult to establish that prison officials are "indifferent" to prisoner health and safety, inmates and attorneys alleging these two requirements have faced limited success.

The Prison Litigation Reform Act (PLRA) further complicates inmates' ability to claim that solitary confinement's psychological damage constitutes cruel and unusual punishment. Section 1997e(e) of the PLRA states that  This demonstrates that the Eighth Amendment provides "greater protection" against physical injury than against mental pain.  Therefore, unless a prisoner can demonstrate physical injury as a result of solitary confinement, he or she is unable to recover damages for any "mental or emotional injury" the confinement causes.  As a result, the Eighth Amendment has not always been proven to be the most effective approach to argue against the practice of solitary confinement.

Due process and the Fourteenth Amendment 
Litigating against solitary confinement on the basis of the Fourteenth Amendment and due process is another less common strategy inmates have used.  The Fourteenth Amendment limits the "types of prisoners" that can be placed in solitary confinement and the time the prisoners can be confined.  The due process clause within the Fourteenth Amendment also regulates solitary confinement in that prisoners must be given reviews before and during their placement in solitary confinement.  Court cases made on these bases do not necessarily address any "underlying problems" of solitary confinement, but they do call for increased monitoring, hearing, and reviews.

Inmates who are placed in solitary confinement "must be accorded meaningful periodic review to ensure that segregation [solitary confinement] is not a 'pretext for indefinite confinement'".  As Jules Lobel, professor at the University of Pittsburgh School of Law, explains,  Lobel contends that the trend in U.S. supermax prisons is to not submit these reviews at all or to provide a review with a predetermined outcome to keep the prisoner in solitary confinement.  If this is indeed the case, then such inmates' due process rights are violated.

In Wilkinson v. Austin, the Supreme Court held that, in addition to the due process right to meaningful review, prisoners also have a due process right to "a statement of the reasons why they were placed or retained at the supermax" so they can better understand how to behave in the future in order to be released from solitary confinement.  Lobel argues that this "implies that the officials must provide something more than a general statement that the prisoner is very dangerous".  According to Lobel this is not what usually happens at supermax facilities, so the inmates' due process rights are violated in this way as well.

In recent circuit court cases, courts have ruled that solitary confinement of 305 days or more constitutes an "atypical and significant hardship" that implicates due process.

Alternative litigation techniques 
Recognizing that the amount of proof needed to show that solitary confinement violates prisoners' rights "is simply too high to trigger constitutional protections," attorneys have started to approach solitary confinement from a different angle.  John F. Cockrell, a recent graduate from the University of Alabama School of Law, suggests that those who challenge solitary confinement do so in context of the Americans with Disabilities Act of 1990 (ADA).  Cockrell reasons that 

In the past few years, several internal committees and administrative bodies involved in the United States prison and legal systems have also begun to question solitary confinement's legality.  In June 2012, for example, the US Senate Judiciary Committee held its first hearing on solitary confinement.  Likewise, as of 2013, the US Bureau of Prisons has announced that it will conduct its first review of how solitary confinement is used in federal prisons.  Additionally, the US Department of Justice found multiple violations of the Constitution and ADA after investigating the use of solitary confinement for mentally ill inmates in two Pennsylvania prisons.  The US Immigration and Customs Enforcement Agency (ICE) has also revised segregation procedures for detainees.

Mentally ill inmates and juveniles 
Studies have illustrated that mentally ill inmates and juveniles are two groups more severely affected by solitary confinement than other prisoners.  As such, the solitary confinement of mentally ill inmates and juveniles has been upheld as cruel and unusual in both international and US courts.

The UN has "expressly prohibit[ed] solitary confinement of juveniles and individuals with mental illness".  The Convention on the Rights of Persons with Disabilities and Convention on the Rights of the Child have played major roles in establishing the UN's position on solitary confinement of mentally ill inmates and juveniles respectively.

Within the US legal system, too, courts have held that the solitary confinement of the mentally ill is "cruel and unusual".  In fact, David Fathi, Director of the ACLU's National Prison Project, found that "every federal court that has considered claims by severely mentally ill prisoners held in solitary confinement has found this treatment unconstitutional".  These court rulings are significant in light of the fact that more than half of the prisoners currently serving jail time in the US are mentally ill according to the US Bureau of Prisons.  Furthermore, approximately 30% or more of prisoners in solitary confinement are mentally ill.  These rulings have the potential to dramatically change how prisons deal with mentally ill inmates, as prison officials would no longer be able to "warehouse" "difficult" prisoners if they have a preexisting mental illness.  These rulings do not guarantee that the mentally ill will not be put in solitary confinement; although they are considered a vulnerable group, these prisoners still have "limited" recourse to the Eighth Amendment.

One landmark case, Madrid v. Gomez, challenged the conditions of the Security Housing Unit (SHU) in the Pelican Bay State Prison.  The court ruled that the current conditions were not "per se violative of the Eighth Amendment" with respect to all inmates.  However, in regard to SHU's isolation of the mentally ill and the conditions of their solitary confinement, the court found that the prison had violated the Eighth Amendment.  Despite it being a landmark case, the rulings of the case have yet to set a trend among cases against other prison systems because SHU's conditions were known to be more extreme and harsh than other supermax prisons.

Juveniles who are charged as adults and placed in adult prisons are usually put in protective custody, and often the conditions of protective custody are similar to those of solitary confinement.  Juvenile justice experts, social scientists, and national correctional standards all agree that solitary confinement is an "ineffective therapeutic tool" that is detrimental to juveniles who are still in an "uncertain, unformed state of social identity".  Given that they are developing mentally and physically, some experts have suggested that "they are severely and permanently damaged by such conditions to a greater extent than adults".

Women 

Solitary confinement of women has particular consequences for women that may differ from the way it affects men. Solitary confinement rates for women in the United States are roughly comparable to those for men and about 20% of prisoners will be in solitary confinement at some point during their prison career. Women also experience tougher sanctions and punishments compared with similar infractions committed by men prisoners.

Black and Latino Americans 
Solitary confinement disproportionally affects people of color. Keramet Reiter, a prison reform activist, conducts interviews and analyzes prison data to determine the highest population of inmates in solitary confinement in a California prison are Black or Latino American. Her interviews with the inmates uncover the inhumane circumstances of social control. The prisoners often experience long periods of isolation, deprived of sensory stimulation, and only receive one hour in a twenty-four-hour period to choose between making a phone call or exercising in the prison yard. The prisoners often serve long sentences, encounter inhumane circumstances, and suffer psychological and physical obstacles. 

The mental health concerns include PTSD, anxiety, depression, and extreme agitation. The physical health concerns include musculoskeletal pain, skin irritations, and weight fluctuations.

Juveniles 
Juveniles are held in solitary confinement in jails and prisons across the United States, often for days, weeks, months, or even years in the name of  punishing, protecting, or housing, some of the youth held there. There is significant controversy surrounding the use of solitary confinement in cases of juveniles.

The effects of solitary confinement on juveniles can be highly detrimental to their growth. The isolation of solitary confinement can cause anguish, provoke serious mental and physical health problems, and work against rehabilitation for juveniles. Because young people are still developing, traumatic experiences like solitary confinement may have a profound effect on their chance to rehabilitate and grow. Solitary confinement can worsen both short- and long-term psychological and physical problems or make it more likely that such problems will develop.

The American Civil Liberties Union (ACLU) and Human Rights Watch created a report that incorporated the testimony of some juvenile inmates. Many interviewees described how their placement in solitary confinement exacerbated the stresses of being in jail or prison. Many spoke of harming themselves with staples, razors, even plastic eating utensils, having hallucinations, losing touch with reality, and having thoughts of or attempting suicide – all this while having very limited access to health care.

Juveniles in solitary confinement are routinely denied access to treatment, services, and programming required to meet their medical, psychological, developmental, social, and rehabilitative needs. The ACLU and the Human Rights Watch have made recommendations at both a State and Federal level regarding their lack of access to medical services etc.

Federal prisons 
The use of SHUs within the Federal Bureau of Prisons is regulated under . When placed in the SHU, prisoners are either in "administrative detention status", a non-punitive status which removes prisoners from the general population when necessary to ensure the safety, security, and orderly operation of correctional facilities, or protect the public, or "disciplinary segregation status", a punitive status imposed only by a Discipline Hearing Officer (DHO) as a sanction for committing prohibited acts. There are more than 100 prohibited acts, all of which may result in solitary confinement, including unauthorized physical contact such as kissing, using abusive or obscene language, feigning illness, circulating a petition, insolence towards a staff member, engaging in or encouraging a group demonstration or protest, and participating in or encouraging a labor strike (also known as a prison strike), gang activity, among others.

State prisons and municipal jails 
Woodbourne Correctional Facility houses the inmate in with the most time spent in New York state's solitary confinement units. Inmate Willie Bosket, now suffering mental and health problems, was confined in Woodbourne Correctional Facility. He has been in SHU for over 20 years after violent incidents directed at prison staff. Allowed no physical contact with humans, he is watched on camera at all times, takes showers in his cell (the water turns on for 10 minutes every two days) and is fed through a metal slot. He is currently serving a sentence of 82 years to life at Five Points Correctional Facility. Luis Rosado, known as 'Blue Boy', is another prisoner with a violent history facing indefinite solitary confinement in New York State's Correctional system. Pavle Stanimirovic writes about both inmates or as he distinguishes between convict and inmate in a book about his 4 years time in Solitary Confinement and long term keep lock . True Crime Author Burl Barer talks about Pavle "Punch" Stanimirovic and how it was in SHU with Blue Boy, in Danamora Clinton CF, Upstate NY.  This is the only known comprehensive first hand account about treatment in Solitary Confinement in the  NYSDOCS.

Solitary confinement is becoming more and more popular throughout the U.S. with some "supermax" prisons have nothing but solitary confinement cells. "Some people are held in solitary confinement in special "supermax" prisons, such as California's Pelican Bay, Virginia's Red Onion, and the federal government's ADX in Florence, Colorado. At least 44 states and the federal system now have supermax prisons, which are generally composed solely of solitary confinement cells. Other prisoners live in SHUs, RHUs, and IMUs within ordinary prisons, and even inside local jails."

California 
When California opened its first "adjustment center", the goal was to return prisoners to the mainline prison population and ultimately to a society through an enrichment program of psychological and social services. However, the plan was never executed. In 1983, George Deukmejian was elected as the California governor and during his time, he formed what was then the state's newest prison – a massive, windowless "security housing unit" (SHU). SHU was intended to segregate over a thousand prisoners from the rest of the prison system through isolation. Deukmejian boasted that the Pelican Bay State Prison was a "state-of-the-art prison that will serve as a model for the rest of the nation...".

The prisoners are kept confined to their cells almost twenty-three hours a day and all forms of human contact through refined locking and monitoring systems are minimized. Pelican Bay SHU was one of the first visible "super-maximum security" facilities and thus it attracted lots of media attention. Those opposing the conditions of California's "supermax" resulted in the federal court criticizing certain features of the prison but left the basic regimen of segregation and isolation largely intact.

One of the policies of supermax confinement among other policies is designed to increase punishment by removing gang members from the mainline population and subject them to solitary confinement, whether it is for a set amount of time or an indefinite duration. In a recent study, it noted that the California Department of corrections has implemented ways to fix their alleged gang problem, such as using 'confidential informants', segregating gang members, intercepting gang communications, setting up task forces to monitor and track gang members, locking up gang leaders in high security prisons, and 'locking down' entire institutions.

These facilities, supermax prisons, were originally designed to contain and control the worst criminals and those who did not adhere to the rules of prisons, AKA "the worst of the worst". As of 2001, the count of inmates in administrative segregation in California was 5,982 representing an 80.2% change over time, but this number is not quite correct due to deficient files provided. Increasingly, the practice of using solitary confinement long term, instead of the intended three-month period, in the supermax prisons as inmate management has become the norm. The selected inmates, who wear jumpsuits that differentiate them from the general population, will spend around 23 hours a day alone in a cell where they are offered very little and fully monitored as is procedure at Pelican Bay State Prison which is one of the largest supermax prisons in the United States. In order to be sent to Pelican Bay, the inmate has either committed murder, assault, riots, threatening staff or fellow inmates, and even gang affiliation which must be validated by the prison staff.

There are 22 SHU units of Pelican Bay which include 132 eight-cell pods that are lit by heavy Plexiglass skylights enclosed by steel cell doors. The inmates are provided with a concrete slab as a bed, a toilet, small shelf, and a concrete stool with no windows in an 80 sq. foot space. SHU inmates are allotted for an hour and a half of exercise every day where they are taken to a 26 by 20 foot area surrounded by 20 foot high cement walls. Only one prisoner from each pod can move at a time and will be placed in waist restraints for any medical/dental appointments to assist in the examination process and may also have leg restraints placed on them before they are able to leave the unit depending on the purpose of the appointment.

In San Quentin State Prison, the violence rates were still high in the 1980s despite the similar lockdowns and procedures of Pelican Bay because these prisoners use the small windows out of lockdown to either harm themselves or others. They typically will try not to harm themselves while in the psychiatric hospital ward either, but they will plan out while in lockdown until they can see their plan through. However even as they near their release dates, they are moved to "prerelease programs" out of the SHU which are successful with some prisoners, but it causes most others to become even more uncontrollable and unpredictable due to their mental states that aren't properly cared for or screened.

In May 2012, California's prison system faced a lawsuit from the Center for Constitutional Rights and a group of California attorneys for the use of long terms of solitary confinement, some lasting for decades.

In September 2014, easing some conditions for inmates in near-solitary confinement in California prisons has died in the state legislature. The bill was among others supposed to reform Security Housing Units rules to allow the inmates to keep photographs and make a phone call after three months of good behavior was listed as inactive on Friday after a decision on Thursday evening by state Senator Loni Hancock to drop it.

Maryland 

In 2012, a report was conducted by the Vera Institute of Justice revealed that Maryland's use of restricted housing was twice the national average (8.5% versus an average of 4%).  Legislation was introduced in in 2015.

According to a psychiatrist, Dr. Annette Hanson's article,  who works with Maryland's Department of Public Safety and Correctional Services (DPSCS), prolonged segregation does not provide deleterious effects on inmates. DPSCS also asserted that solitary confinement doesn't exist in their institutions.

New York 
Since the 1980s, the New York City Department of Correction has increased the use of segregation as a discipline and management tool. In effect, segregation is a secondary sentence imposed by the correctional facility, which is usually unrelated to the conviction for which the person is incarcerated. There are high rates of use of solitary confinement in New York when compared to other U.S. states.  Within the New York prison system, solitary confinement is frequently imposed for nonviolent, "trivial prisoner offenses." Usually the common misconception is that solitary confinement is a punishment of last resort, reserved for inmates who present a threat of violence or escape. Inmates that are released from solitary confinement go through a "transitional unit" but failure in the program results in their return to solitary confinement.  Overall, most of the inmates fail and return to solitary confinement. New York has the highest rate of "disciplinary segregation" in the country, making solitary confinement a regular every day action among the prison. Although prisons nationwide have decreased use of solitary confinement, the New York City Department of Correction expanded its capacity by 27 percent in 2011 and another 44 percent in 2012, according to the NYC Jails Action Coalition. Although the DOC housed 1,000 more inmates in 1990 than it does today, its jails have more solitary cells now. Due to this the city is topping the charts of municipalities with a high rate of solitary confinement. On any given day, there are about 4,500 men, women, and children in some form of isolated confinement in New York State prisons. This is not including New York City's jails, which are run under a separate system, where those in solitary confinement reach close to 1,000 or more.

A new bill was introduced by Councilman Danny Dromm would require the Department of Correction to post a monthly report on its website about punitive segregation. It would also require data on the number of people in punitive segregation, the length of time in this setting, the nature of the infractions, age, mental health, if they were prescribed medication or moved to a hospital, violence against others and inmate requests. Many are supportive of this bill with the goal being to make jail facilities safer for inmates and correction officers.Individuals who are released and experience solitary confinement go back into their communities and reoffend at higher rates than general population prisoners causing them to land back into prison.  Policy changes that will reduce the use and long-term impact of segregation will benefit not only the staff and prisoners in these units but also ultimately the well-being of facilities, systems, and the community.  Councilman Dromm also issued a separate resolution seeking to end the practice of the time owed. For example, an inmate, because of good behavior or other reasons, might only have served 100 of his or her 180-day sentence in solitary and then was released. A few years or even decades later the person is rearrested. Under current rules he or she must complete those unserved 80 days in solitary. This resolution however is only a request since the Council does not have the authority to make the Department of Correction adhere.

On April 1, 2021 Governor Andrew Cuomo signed a bill that restricted the use of solitary confinement to periods of no more than 15 consecutive days. The law will go into effect in March 2022.

New York City: Rikers Island 
The New York City Department of Corrections reported that in fiscal year 2012 more than 14.4 percent of all adolescents detained at Rikers Island between the ages of 16 and 18 were held in at least one period of solitary confinement while detained. The average length of time young people spent in solitary confinement at Rikers Island was 43 days. More than 48 percent of adolescents at this institution have diagnosed mental health problems. As violence associated with the crack epidemic became increasingly common, new measures were taken. The Red ID card system, instituted in the early 1990s, was a way of identifying inmates with histories of inciting riots, cuttings, stabbings, and other dangerous behaviors. It almost always meant the convict had spent time in a notorious ward designated for punitive confinement called "The Bing" (HDM 5 Block). Prisoners  Pavle Stanimirović, James Rosado, Tyrone Green, Pedro Hernandez, Willie Bosket, Hector Rivera, Ángel Díaz, John Maldonado and Dominick Pollatti all spent time in "The Bing."

The New York City Department of Correction ended punitive segregation for adolescents in December 2014, and ended punitive segregation for young adults, 18 to 21, in October 2016. This is partly due to the case of Kalief Browder. Browder was falsely accused of and arrested for stealing a backpack in March 2010. He was placed in confinement for 3 years and would eventually commit suicide soon after his release, unable to cope with the traumatic psychological effects of confinement.

Psychiatric hospitals
Patients in psychiatric hospitals are often put into solitary confinement, usually for 15 minutes at a time, when staff members determine that they are a danger to themselves or others.

Secure housing units 
Officially, the purpose of placing prisoners in secure housing units (SHUs) is to increase control over dangerous inmates. Some hope the SHU encourages prisoners to reflect on their actions. These units are characterized by extreme isolation of prisoners who "are housed in small cells with solid steel doors…for 22 to 23 hours per day." Inmates are also deprived of social interaction and denied access to educational or therapeutic programs and health care while being held in SHUs.

Psychological effects 
It has been shown that the conditions of these secure housing units have severe mental and psychological effects on prisoners. Prisoners in SHUs are isolated for long periods of time. Instances of assault and torture against these prisoners in response to trivial things have also been cited. Social isolation housing can reduce environmental stimulation and causes a feeling of loss of control over all aspects of a prisoner's daily life. These environmental risks include but are not limited to hypersensitivity to stimuli, distortions and hallucinations, increased anxiety and nervousness, diminished impulse control, severe and chronic depression, appetite loss and weight loss, heart palpitations, talking to oneself, problems sleeping, nightmares, self-mutilation, difficulties with thinking, concentration, and memory, and lower levels of brain function. Researchers at McGill University paid a group of male graduate students to stay in small chambers that were to replicate solitary confinement cells. This study was to conduct an experiment on sensory deprivation and how it can cause psychiatric disorders while in solitary confinement as people are deprived of most of their senses in there. The plan was to observe these students for six weeks, but none lasted more than seven days. The common justification by officials is that prisoners of certain natures deserve to be punished for the threat that they pose to society. This can be attributed to the fear of increasing crime rates and therefore, support the government's effort to enforce harsher forms of punishment.

The most "notorious example of the extreme social isolation found in supermaximum custody units" is the SHU at SouthPort NYDOCS Upstate Correctional Facility and Pelican Bay State Prison. From studying conditions at Pelican Bay, researchers argue that long-term social isolation "carries major psychiatric risks." Prisoners are susceptible to developing mental illnesses because they are confined to coffin-like conditions and denied access to basic health services. Illnesses range from anxiety, clinical depression, and self-mutilation to suicidal thoughts and SHU syndrome. Yet, it is important to note that the duration of the isolation is the most important factor in determining the effects of solitary confinement.

Scrutiny 
Supermax prisons, large-scale implementations of secure housing units, employ solitary confinement to isolate predatory, disorderly inmates from the rest of the prison community. Federal Bureau of Prisons create special supermax facilities to contain the most aggressive inmates in a protective effort. Kate King, professor and director of Criminal Justice at Murray State University, Benjamin Steiner, professor of Criminal Justice at the University of Cincinnati, and Stephanie Ritchie Breach, director of the Third District Youth Court, explain how while violence has always been a factor in prison life, the level of aggression is magnified in facilities where all such members of the prison system are concentrated. These scholars argue that the violent nature of supermax prisons such as Pelican Bay State Prison are perpetrated by prison culture itself. King, Steiner, and Breach question the effectiveness of these institutions and claim the violent reputation of American prisons stems from this departure from the treatment model. Supermax prisons are also scrutinized on legal and ethical bases. Scholars Jesenia Pizarro and Vanja Stenius note that the overall constitutionality of these prisons are still quite unclear. Many argue the conditions in which these inmates live do not meet the standards of the Eighth Amendment to the United States Constitution.

Recidivism 
Shira E. Gordon, a University of Michigan Law Student, argues that solitary confinement leads to an increase in recidivism and violence. To substantiate this conclusion, she cites two quantitative research based studies that support this nexus and counters those who argue that solitary confinement deters recidivism. Daniel Mears and William Bales “compared recidivism rates by matching…prisoners who were incarcerated in solitary confinement with prisoners who had been in the general prison population.” They found that "24.2 percent of the prisoners held in solitary confinement were reconvicted of a violent crime compared to 20.5 percent of prisoners held in population." And this behavior may be attributed to the mental illnesses prisoners may develop, as well as the dehumanizing treatment they are subject to.

See also
 Angola Three
 Prison#Control units
 History of United States prison systems
 Isolation to facilitate abuse
 Prison abolition movement
 Single-celling
 Box (form of torture involving solitary confinement in an overheated room)
 List of United States Supreme Court cases involving mental health

References

Penal system in the United States